Bunny Rabbit was a puppet character on the children's television show Captain Kangaroo.   Bunny Rabbit wore horn-rimmed glasses, and would trick the Captain into giving him his carrots.   Bunny Rabbit was a hand puppet created and manipulated by Cosmo Allegretti.

Notes

Puppets
Fictional rabbits and hares